The 1964–65 Serie A season was the 31st season of the Serie A, the top level of ice hockey in Italy. Six teams participated in the league, and SG Cortina won the championship.

First round

Final round

External links
 Season on hockeytime.net

1964–65 in Italian ice hockey
Serie A (ice hockey) seasons
Italy